The 2002 World Interuniversity Games were the fourth edition of the Games (organised by IFIUS), and were held in Barcelona, Spain.

External links
 Homepage IFIUS

World Interuniversity Games
World Interuniversity Games
World Interuniversity Games
International sports competitions hosted by Spain
2002
Multi-sport events in Spain
Sports competitions in Barcelona
2002 in Catalan sport
2000s in Barcelona